The 1991 Kogi State gubernatorial election occurred on December 14, 1991. NRC candidate Abubakar Audu won the election.

Conduct
The gubernatorial election was conducted using an open ballot system. Primaries for the two parties to select their flag bearers were conducted on October 19, 1991.

The election occurred on December 14, 1991. NRC candidate Abubakar Audu won the election.

References 

Kogi State gubernatorial elections